Austin FC is an American professional soccer club based in Austin, Texas. The club competes in Major League Soccer (MLS) as a member of the Western Conference. Founded in 2018, the club began play in the 2021 season. Their home stadium is Q2 Stadium in north Austin. They are the first major professional sports league team to play in Texas' capital, which prior to 2021 was the largest city in the United States without such a team.

History 
Austin FC is the first top-division major professional sports team in the Austin area, a market that had been previously overlooked by the major professional sports leagues due in part to the state capital's traditional support for the Texas Longhorns collegiate teams. The city's previous experience with professional soccer includes the Austin Aztex FC, which moved to Orlando in 2008 and eventually became MLS side Orlando City SC; the 2011 reincarnation of the Austin Aztex, which went on indefinite hiatus following the 2015 Memorial Day floods washing out their venue at House Park; and Austin Bold FC, which played in the second-division USL Championship at Circuit of the Americas from 2019 to 2021.

In October 2017, Columbus Crew SC operator Precourt Sports Ventures announced their intention to move the group's MLS franchise rights to Austin for the 2019 MLS season.

After several sessions, the Austin City Council, by a 7–4 vote during a special session on August 15, 2018, granted the City Manager the authority to negotiate and execute a lease for a stadium with Precourt Sports Ventures.

On August 22, 2018, the group unveiled the name and badge for the club at the North Door on Austin's east side. The crest was designed by local Austin brand studio The Butler Bros, who explained the badge as including the signature color "Bright Verde" to "project the vibrancy and creative energy of Austin", intertwined oaks that "stand for the bond between Club and City", and the four roots uniting all compass directions of Austin, North, East, South, and West.

In October 2018, an Ohio-based group which includes Jimmy and Dee Haslam, owners of the National Football League's Cleveland Browns, and Columbus-based physician and businessman Pete Edwards, announced their intentions to acquire Columbus Crew to keep the team from moving. MLS officials stated that if the transfer of the Crew's operating rights were successful, Austin FC would be an expansion team operated by Precourt to begin play by 2021.

On December 19, 2018, Precourt Sports Ventures and the City of Austin reached a financing agreement for a new soccer-specific stadium to be constructed at McKalla Place, which was projected to open by early 2021. Nine days after finalizing the stadium deal, Precourt Sports Ventures reached an agreement in principle to transfer the operating rights of the Columbus Crew SC to the Haslam and Edwards families in January 2019.

On January 15, 2019, Austin FC was officially announced as an MLS club with a 2021 start date. In July 2019, the ownership group was renamed to Two Oak Ventures and later expanded to include local celebrities and businesspeople.

Josh Wolff was named the club's first head coach on July 23, 2019, and Claudio Reyna was announced as their sporting director on November 21.

First seasons
Austin FC hired Josh Wolff as their first head coach in July 2019 and hired Claudio Reyna as the club's Sporting Director in November of the same year. The two were teammates for the United States from 1999-2006.

In July 2020, Austin signed their first ever player, Rodney Redes.

Before the start of their inaugural season, Alexander Ring was named the first club captain.

Austin FC played their first MLS match against LAFC at Banc of California Stadium on April 17, 2021, losing 0–2. The club secured its first victory the following week against the Colorado Rapids, winning 3–1. Diego Fagúndez scored the club's first goal and the following two were scored by the club's first Designated Player, Cecilio Dominguez. Their home opener was held on June 19, 2021, against the San Jose Earthquakes, a match which ended in a scoreless draw. The team secured its first ever home victory on July 1, 2021, defeating the Portland Timbers 4–1. Jon Gallagher scored the team's first home goal and the first MLS goal at Q2 Stadium.

Austin FC signed Sebastián Driussi, on July 29, 2021, from Zenit St. Petersburg for a $7 million transfer fee. He became the first player to score 10, 20, and 30 career goals for the club on April 16, August 6, and October 23, 2022, respectively, and was named the club's first All-Star that season.

In 2022, Austin FC started the season with an MLS record 10 goals in their first two matches. They lost 2–1 in their first ever cup match in the third round of the 2022 U.S. Open Cup against San Antonio FC on April 20; Fagundez scored the club's first ever Open Cup goal. On July 16, they won the Division 1 Copa Tejas, the first trophy in franchise history. Austin FC clinched their first ever playoff berth on September 14 in a 3-0 home win against Real Salt Lake where Moussa Djitte scored the first ever hat trick in club history. Austin won their first MLS playoff game at home over Real Salt Lake on October 16, 2022, prevailing 3–1 in a penalty shootout after a 2–2 score following extra time. Austin advanced to the Western Conference Final after defeating FC Dallas, which they lost to LAFC 3-0.

In August 2022, the club announced they would debut a reserves team in MLS Next Pro in 2023, Austin FC II.

Based on their 2022 finish, Austin FC qualified for the 2023 CONCACAF Champions League, their first continental competition. They played Violette AC from Haiti and lost 3–2 on aggregate. Austin FC will also compete in their first regional competition at the 2023 Leagues Cup.

Stadium 

Austin FC are the operators of a newly built stadium at McKalla Place. The stadium is near The Domain, a large shopping center complex. The stadium, built on public land and owned by the City of Austin, was privately financed by Two Oak Ventures. The lease was signed on December 19, 2018. The stadium seats 20,738 fielded its first Austin FC game on June 19, 2021.

The club announced plans for a $45 million, privately funded training facility, the St. David's Performance Center, on November 13, 2019. The performance center, located in the Parmer Pond development in northeast Austin, will have four full-size soccer fields, one with a 1,000 capacity seating section, in addition to a 30,000 square foot indoor facility.

In 2022, the Capital Metropolitan Transportation Authority started construction on a commuter rail station for the Red Line, McKalla Station. It is expected to be finished in 2023, as part of Project Connect.

Club culture 

Austin FC has several supporters' groups, including Austin Anthem, Los Verdes, the La Murga de Austin band, Fighting Leslies DC, the student-oriented Burnt Orange Brigade, and a group from New Braunfels, Oak Army New Braunfels.

The club colors are bright green (stylized by the club as "verde," the Spanish word for the color) and black. The team's color scheme has been frequently highlighted in team promotions and at Q2 Stadium, with green lights flashing after each Austin goal.

Austin FC have sold out all 36 home games since their debut at Q2, which is currently the longest active streak in MLS.

Sponsorship

Broadcasting
For the 2021 and 2022 seasons, Nexstar Media Group served as the team's broadcast partner. The majority of games appeared on KNVA, with select matches also appearing on KXAN and KBVO. Adrian Healey served as the play-by-play announcer, while Michael Lahoud joined in as a color analyst. From 2023, every Austin FC match is available via MLS Season Pass on the Apple TV app.

Radio rights are held by Alt 97.5 FM, with Lincoln Rose on the call.

In April 2021, Austin FC reached a deal with Univision as its Spanish broadcast partner. KAKW and KTFO will broadcast each regionally televised match in Spanish, while KLQB serves as Austin FC's flagship Spanish radio station.

Ownership and management
Austin FC is owned by Two Oak Ventures, formerly known as Precourt Sports Ventures, which is led by CEO Anthony Precourt. Other investing partners in Two Oak Ventures include actor Matthew McConaughey, local entrepreneur Eduardo Margain, former Dell executive Marius Haas, and energy entrepreneur Bryan Sheffield.

Players and staff

Roster

Out on loan

Technical 
{| class="wikitable"
|-
! style="background:#00AE42; color:#000000;" scope="col" colspan="2"|Executive

|-
! style="background:#00AE42; color:#000000;" scope="col" colspan="2"|Coaching Staff

Honors 
 Minor 
 Copa Tejas (Division 1)
 Champions (1): 2022

Records

Seasons

See also
 Copa Tejas: Intrastate rivalry with FC Dallas and Houston Dynamo FC

References

External links
 
 

 
Association football clubs established in 2018
Major League Soccer teams
Soccer clubs in Texas
2018 establishments in Texas